IHME or Ihme may refer to:

 Institute for Health Metrics and Evaluation, Seattle, United States 
 Ihme, river in Germany 
 IHME Contemporary Art Festival, Finland